|}

The Kilvington Fillies' Stakes is a Listed flat horse race in Great Britain open to fillies and mares aged three years or older. It is run at Nottingham over a distance of 6 furlongs and 18 yards, and it is scheduled to take place each year in May.

The race was first run in 2000.

Records

Most successful horse:
 No horse has won this race more than once

Leading jockey (2 wins):
 Shane Kelly - Angus Newz (2006), Light Refrain (2021)

Leading trainer (2 wins):
 Tim Easterby - Hot Tin Roof (2000), Golden Nun (2000)
 William Haggas - Pretty Baby (2018), Light Refrain (2021)

Winners

See also 
Horse racing in Great Britain
List of British flat horse races

Notes

References 

Racing Post: 

Flat races in Great Britain
Nottingham Racecourse
Sprint category horse races for fillies and mares
Recurring sporting events established in 2000
2000 establishments in England